Comet C/2018 V1 (Machholz–Fujikawa–Iwamoto) is a minor body that follows a slightly hyperbolic orbit (eccentricity > 1, 16.4-sigma). It was visually discovered on 7 November 2018 by Donald Machholz using an 18.5-inch reflecting telescope
and it reached perihelion on 3 December 2018.

Overview
It was estimated to be between 8 and 10th magnitude from mid-November to mid-December 2018, visible in a small telescope. The value of its total (absolute magnitude of comet and coma) magnitude is 14.6 mag. It was discovered by three amateur astronomers: by an observer in Colfax, California, USA and by two observers in Japan. The observations by three astronomers result in the name for the comet, Machholz-Fujikawa-Iwamoto. The current orbit determination of this comet is based on 750 observations with a 37-day observation arc.

Comet C/2018 V1 has a significant probability (72.6%) of having an extrasolar provenance although an origin in the Oort Cloud cannot be excluded. As the present-day value of its barycentric orbital eccentricity is greater than 1, this comet is currently escaping from the Solar System, aiming for interstellar space.

See also 
 List of parabolic comets

References

External links 
 MPEC 2018-V151: COMET C/2018 V1 (Machholz-Fujikawa-Iwamoto)
 Amateur Don Machholz Discovers His 12th Comet!, Sky and Telescope, 9 November 2018
 Arizona Amateur Discovers New Dawn Comet — Here’s How To Find It Bob King, 11 November 2018
 Comet C/2018 V1 (Machholz-Fujikawa-Iwamoto) Sky Charts and Coordinates 
 JPL viewer
 

Non-periodic comets
Comets in 2018
Astronomical objects discovered in 2018